"Regret" is a maxi-single by The Gazette. It was released as two different types: the Optical Impression and Auditory Impression, the first coming with a DVD with the music video for the song "Regret", and the second with a bonus track.

Track listing

Regret -Optical Impression-
Disc one
 "Regret" - 4:30
 "Psychedelic Heroine" - 3:20
Disc two (DVD)
 "Regret" - 4:30
 "Making of Regret"

Regret -Auditory Impression-
 "Regret" - 4:30
 "Psychedelic Heroine" - 3:20
 "Worthless War" 3:50

Note
 The music video for "Regret" was already viewable a few months before the official release of the single.
 The single reached a peak mark of #9 on the Japanese Oricon Weekly Charts.

References

2006 singles
The Gazette (band) songs